is a railway station on the Hokuriku Main Line in the city of Fukui, Fukui Prefecture, Japan, operated by the West Japan Railway Company (JR West).

Lines

Station layout
The station consists of two unnumbered opposed side platforms connected by a footbridge. The station is staffed.

Platforms

History
Morita Station opened on 20 September 1897.  The station was destroyed by the 1948 Fukui earthquake, and was reopened the following year. With the privatization of Japanese National Railways (JNR) on 1 April 1987, the station came under the control of JR West.

Passenger statistics
In fiscal 2016, the station was used by an average of 840 passengers daily (boarding passengers only).

Surrounding area
former Morita Town Hall
Jin-ai Women's College

See also
 List of railway stations in Japan

References

External links

  

Railway stations in Fukui Prefecture
Stations of West Japan Railway Company
Railway stations in Japan opened in 1897
Hokuriku Main Line
Fukui (city)